Charles Lennox Cumming-Bruce (20 February 1790 – 1 January 1875), was a Scottish Conservative politician. He was the second son of Sir Alexander Cumming-Gordon, 1st Baronet, and in 1820 married Mary Elizabeth Bruce, the only daughter of James Bruce.

He served as the Member of Parliament for the Inverness Burghs constituency from 1831 to 1837 - being re-elected in 1834 with a majority of only four votes, and for Elginshire and Nairnshire from 1840 to 1868.

Cumming-Bruce's only child Elizabeth Mary Cumming-Bruce married James Bruce, 8th Earl of Elgin.

He is commemorated on the monument to James Bruce of Kinnaird on the east face of the iron monument.

References

External links 
 

1790 births
1875 deaths
Members of the Parliament of the United Kingdom for Highland constituencies
Scottish Tory MPs (pre-1912)
UK MPs 1831–1832
UK MPs 1832–1835
UK MPs 1835–1837
UK MPs 1837–1841
UK MPs 1841–1847
UK MPs 1847–1852
UK MPs 1852–1857
UK MPs 1857–1859
UK MPs 1859–1865
UK MPs 1865–1868
Younger sons of baronets
Charles